Plamen Iliev may refer to:

 Plamen Iliev (footballer, born 1991), Bulgarian football goalkeeper
 Plamen Iliev (footballer, born 1994), Bulgarian football winger